The Baca language, Nubaca, is a Bantu language of Cameroon.

References

Mbam languages
Languages of Cameroon